Cumberland State Forest is a wet sclerophyll forest in Sydney, New South Wales, Australia. Situated on the southern edge of the Hornsby Plateau, the forest is located in the suburb of West Pennant Hills, Sydney and contains 40 hectares of native forest. It is the only metropolitan state forest in Australia.

History
The original land was privately owned and was cleared in 1908. In 1938 its management was taken over by the then NSW Forestry Commission, and one third of the land was planted as an arboretum while the rest was allowed to regenerate naturally. What is seen today is more than 50 years of forest growth.

Recreation
A number of walking tracks can be explored by visitors who can enjoy the onsite cafe or use the picnic and barbecue facilities. As of December 2016, TreeTops Adventure Park, a high ropes course, has been operating within Cumberland State Forest. The NSW Forestry Corporation runs volunteer and school holiday activities programs within the forest.

Species
Tree species in the forest include:

 Elaeocarpus reticulatus
 Glochidion ferdinandi
 Pittosporum undulatum
 Eucalyptus saligna
 Eucalyptus pilularis
 Eucalyptus crebra 
Eucalyptus punctata  
Eucalyptus fibrosa  
Corymbia maculata
 Syncarpia glomulifera

References

External links 

 Forestry Corporation - Cumberland State Forest
 Explore the wonders of Cumberland State Forest - Australia's only metropolitan State forest

New South Wales state forests
The Hills Shire
Parks in Sydney
Nature reserves in New South Wales
Remnant urban bushland